Claude Road is a rural locality in the local government area (LGA) of Kentish in the North-west and west LGA region of Tasmania. The 2016 census recorded a population of 257 for the state suburb of Claude Road.

History 
Claude Road was gazetted as a locality in 1965. A Post Office of that name opened in 1906.

Geography
Most boundaries are survey lines. The Dasher River, a tributary of the Mersey River, flows through from south-west to north-east where it briefly follows the northern boundary.

Road infrastructure 
Route C136 (Claude Road) passes through from north-east to south-west.

References

Towns in Tasmania
Localities of Kentish Council